Wallace Darnell Johnson (born December 25, 1956) is an American former professional baseball player and coach. He was a first baseman with the Montreal Expos and San Francisco Giants and Chicago White Sox third base coach and is also known for his skill as a pinch hitter. Johnson was a switch hitter and threw right-handed.

Amateur career

Johnson graduated from Indiana State University with a B.S degree in Accounting. He was named to the CoSida Academic All-American team, NCAA Postgraduate Scholarship and received the McMillan Memorial Award for leadership. He was a Co-Captain of Indiana State's first Missouri Valley Conference baseball championship and first appearance in NCAA regional post season play. He led the nation in hitting (.502) during the regular season and was named the MVC tournament MVP. He was named to the Missouri Valley Conference All-Centennial Team and enshrined in the Indiana State University Hall of Fame in 1985.

Professional career

Wallace was drafted by the Montreal Expos in the sixth round of the 1979 amateur draft and one of the first Indiana ballplayers selected.  He began his professional career in the New York-Penn League that summer; by the next season (1980) he was leading the Florida State League in batting (.334) and stolen bases (58) He was named the MVP of the FSL Southern Division and received the Topps chewing gum George M Trautman Award for Minor League Player of the Year for the FSL.

He played on the 1981 Denver Bears (AAA) and 1986 Indianapolis Indians (AAA) championship teams. He made his major league debut for the Expos in September 1981 and on October 3, Johnson delivered a pinch-hit triple (scoring 2 runs) off of New York Mets ace reliever Neil Allen that help propel the team to its first ever NL East title. Johnson's was an acclaimed pinch-hitter. He was the Expos' all-time pinch-hit leader with 86. He played winter ball for the champion Leones de Escogido under the direction of manager Felipe Alou and was named player of the week for the period November 30 thru December 6.

The next spring, the Giants released him, and he returned to the Expos as a free agent shortly thereafter.

On May 2, 1988, Johnson broke up the perfect game bid of Ron Robinson of the Cincinnati Reds; Johnson got a single with two outs and two strikes in the 9th inning.

Johnson led the major leagues in pinch-hits during the period 1986-1990. In February 1990, Johnson won his arbitration case against the Expos and was the only winner of players that filed arbitration cases that year.

On August 11, 1990, he was released by the Montreal Expos again and signed with the Oakland Athletics, but he did not appear in any games for the A's. He played his final major league game on August 3, 1990. Johnson was a teammates of five Hall of Famers during his Expos tenure, that included Gary Carter, Andre Dawson, Tim Raines, Randy Johnson and Larry Walker.

Coaching career
He spent one season as the hitting instructor for the 1994 Gulf Coast League Expos, three years (-) coaching in the Atlanta Braves minor league system and five years as the third base coach with the Chicago White Sox. He was part of the 2000 AL Division championship that led the league in runs scored and offense. The team lost in the playoffs to the Seattle Mariners. Former major leaguer and TV analyst Hawk Harrelson gave him the nickname "Wavin Wally". His coaching career included instructing two Hall of Famers, Frank "Big Hurt" Thomas and Vladimir Guerrero.

References

External links

1956 births
Living people
African-American baseball coaches
African-American baseball players
American expatriate baseball players in Canada
Baseball coaches from Indiana
Baseball players from Gary, Indiana
Chicago White Sox coaches
Denver Bears players
Indiana State Sycamores baseball players
Indianapolis Indians players
Jamestown Expos players
Major League Baseball first basemen
Major League Baseball third base coaches
Memphis Chicks players
Montreal Expos players
Phoenix Giants players
San Francisco Giants players
Sportspeople from Gary, Indiana
Tacoma Tigers players
West Palm Beach Expos players
Wichita Aeros players
21st-century African-American people
20th-century African-American sportspeople